Hugh Howard (born 1952) is an American historian, writer, and speaker. He has written numerous books about architecture, art, and American presidents, but describes himself as a narrative historian: he seeks to use stories to capture the sweep of history, with  facts, personalities, and places adding texture to events. 

His most recent book, Architects of an American Landscape, published by Atlantic Monthly Press in 2022, examines the creative friendship of Frederick Law Olmsted, the co-designer of Central Park and founder of the discipline of landscape architecture, and Henry Hobson Richardson, the most admired  American architect of the nineteenth century.  

Previous books include Architecture's Odd Couple (Bloomsbury, 2015), also a dual biography, which looked at the careers of Frank Lloyd Wright and Philip Johnson, architects who bracketed the twentieth century and who had a complicated relationship as "frienemies." Howard has written two books concerning the architectural work of Thomas Jefferson, Thomas Jefferson, Architect (Rizzoli, 2003) and Dr. Kimball and Mr. Jefferson (Bloomsbury 2006), as well as a book about the birthing of American painting by the many who painted portraits of George Washington, The Painter's Chair (Bloomsbury, 2009). 

He has also collaborated with photographer Roger Straus III on a series of large-format volumes, including Houses of the Founding Fathers (Workman, 2007),  Houses of the Presidents and Houses of Civil War America (Little, Brown, 2012 and 2014, respectively).

Career
Aside from writing books, Howard has written for dozens of publications including Smithsonian, The New York Times, The Washington Post, House Beautiful, Preservation, Early American Life, Traditional Homes, and others. He was the researcher, writer, and scout for a series of television specials produced by the A&E Network In Search of Palladio. 

Prior to becoming a full-time writer, he was Vice President of the New York Times Book Company, Inc. In 2011, he was an Attingham scholar. He has served as a board member at various historical sites, including Mark Twain House and Museum, the Edna St. Vincent Millay Society, Cheekwood Estate and Gardens, and the Historic Eastfield Foundation, where he was the founding editor of The Eastfield Record.

Personal life
Howard divides his time between the Hudson Valley in New New York and New Hampshire's Upper Valley. He and his wife, Betsy, have two adult daughters. His memoir House-Dreams (Algonquin, 2003) recounts he design and construction of a Federal Revival-style home for his family in the mid-1990s.

Published work

References

External links
Hugh Howard website
"One Question" with Hugh Howard at neoteric Art

1952 births
Living people
21st-century American historians
21st-century American male writers
American male non-fiction writers